Xəlitli (also, Xalidli, Khalidly and Khalydly) is a village and municipality in the Goychay Rayon of Azerbaijan.  It has a population of 1,158.

References 

Populated places in Goychay District